Ramesh Krishnan was the defending champion, but lost in the first round this year.

Michael Stich won the tournament, beating Emilio Sánchez in the final, 6–2, 6–4.

Seeds

Draw

Finals

Top half

Bottom half

External links
 Main draw

OTB Open
1991 ATP Tour